"Money Money Money" was a Kevin Ayers single issued to promote his 1980 album, That's What You Get Babe. By this time fiscal realities were obviously shadowing the naiveté of his psychedelic youth as he ruefully notes; “You get moonlight in the evening / Sunshine by day / That's all you get for nothing / You want more?” The B-side is his 1971 single ‘Stranger in Blue Suede Shoes’.

Track listing

"Money Money Money" (Kevin Ayers)
"Stranger In Blue Suede Shoes" (Kevin Ayers)

Personnel
Kevin Ayers / Guitar, Vocals 
Liam Genockey / Drums 
Ollie Halsall / Bass 
Neil Lancaster / Vocals  
 /  Acoustic Guitar, Banjo, Brass Synth, Piano, Violin, Electric Piano, Mandolin, Vocals 
Clare Torry / Vocals

Kevin Ayers songs
1980 singles
Songs written by Kevin Ayers
1980 songs
Harvest Records singles